Semen extender is a liquid diluent which is added to semen to preserve its fertilizing ability. It acts as a buffer to protect sperm cells from their own toxic byproducts, as well as protecting the sperm from cold shock and osmotic shock during the chilling and shipping process (the semen is chilled to reduce metabolism). The extender allows the semen to be shipped to the female, rather than requiring the male and female to be near to each other. Special freezing extender use also allows cryogenic preservation of sperm, which may be transported for use, or used on-site at a later date.

Semen extenders should not be confused with drugs or nutritional supplements designed to increase the volume of semen released during an ejaculation. The efficacy and utility of volume increasers is dubious.

Function
The addition of extender to semen protects the sperm cells against possible damage by toxic seminal plasma, as well as providing nutrients and cooling buffers if the semen is to be cooled. Semen extender also serves to protect sperm from bacteria by adding antibiotics to it to prevent increase of bacteria. In the case of freezing extenders, one or more penetrating cryoprotectants will be added. Typical cryoprotectants include glycerol, DMSO and dimethylformamide. Egg yolk, which has cryoprotective properties, is also a common component.

Ingredients
In the equine Kenney extender (named after its developer, Dr. Robert M. Kenney) has been used for many years, and contains a non-fat dried milk solid (NFDMS) and glucose. Dual-sugar extenders typically have similar ingredients, with an additional sugar, sucrose. Other extenders (e.g., INRA '96) may also contain milk components.

Antibiotics are almost universal in semen extenders, especially those being used for shipping or freezing semen. Ticarcillin (often used in combination with clavulanic acid under the designation timentin), amikacin sulfate, penicillin, and gentamicin are commonly used. The latter - gentamicin - has been noted to reduce sperm motility in the equine. In human semen extenders, antibiotics are required for regulatory reasons, so their use is almost universal in clinics, even though antibiotics can be detrimental to sperm. This is because in procedures such as IVF with frozen sperm, the sperm does not need to swim up the reproductive tract on their own, and the detrimental effects of the antibiotics are not problematic. When private donors ship chilled semen outside of the formal regulatory environment, and fertilization is accomplished by allowing sperm to swim through the reproductive tract without the help of procedures such as IVF, then it is possible to achieve better results without antibiotics.

Brands

Porcine
Androhep Plus Minitube 
Androstar Plus Minitube
MIII Minitube
BTS Minitube 
MR-A Kubus
Beltsville Liquid (BL-1)
Acromax
Beltsville Thawing Solution (BTS)
Illinois Variable Temperature (IVT)
Kiev
MULBERRY III
Reading
X-Cell
Zorlesco
ZORPVA
MS Dilufert, various generations (3, 6, 9, 10) 
Preserv Xtra

Bovine
Andromed Minitube
Andromed CSS  Minitube
Bioxcell
CRYOBOS
Triladyl  Minitube
Biladyl  Minitube
Steridyl Minitube
Biociphos 
Bovifree Minitube

Equine
AndroMed-E  Minitube
Kenney (often marketed under a brand name - e.g. E-Z Mixin')
VMDZ
BotuCrio (Botupharma)
INRA '96
Universal dual-sugar
Gent Extenders  Minitube
Equipro  Minitube
Spervital extenders (http://www.spervital.nl)
 EQUIDIL (EMBRYOLAB-UFSM)
SBS semen extenders Minitube

Human
Test Yolk Buffer (TYB) by Irvine

References

Fertility
Animal breeding
Artificial insemination